Rocky Rasley (born April 27, 1947) is a former American football guard in the National Football League from 1969–1970, 1972–1976.  He attended Bakersfield's South High School and Bakersfield College before enrolling at Oregon State University where he played college football under Dee Andros during the "Giant Killers" season of 1967.  The entire 1967 squad was later inducted into the Oregon Sports Hall of Fame.  Rasley was also inducted into the Bob Elias Kern County Sports Hall of Fame.

Rasley was one of five Beavers selected in the 1969 NFL Draft, and was selected in the ninth round (216th overall) by the Detroit Lions.  He played with the Lions for the 1969 and 1970 seasons, was on the Lions' taxi-squad during 1971, and rejoined the team for the 1972 and 1973 seasons.  He then went to the New Orleans Saints for a season, followed by a season with the Kansas City Chiefs.  Rasley was selected by the Seattle Seahawks in the 1976 NFL Expansion Draft, but did not make the active roster and wound up playing for the San Francisco 49ers his last season.

Prior to joining the NFL, Rasley was a competitive wrestler.  He finished 6th in the heavyweight (+100 kg) weight class at the 1969 FILA Wrestling World Championships, placing behind event winner Aleksandr Medved. Rasley also wrestled for the Oregon State Beavers wrestling team, and was a letterman in 1968.

References

 Season of the Giant Killers
 Becky's Place Page Regarding Rasley
 Oregon State University Historical NFL Draft Picks
 1976 NFL Expansion Draft
 United States FILA Team 1969
 Teams inducted into Oregon Sports Hall of Fame

1947 births
American football offensive linemen
Detroit Lions players
Kansas City Chiefs players
Living people
New Orleans Saints players
Oregon State Beavers football players
San Francisco 49ers players